ICC World Cricket League Division Seven was the second-lowest division of the World Cricket League (WCL) system for its 2009–14 and 2012–18 cycles. Like all other divisions, WCL Division Seven was contested as a standalone tournament rather than as an actual league.

The inaugural Division Seven tournament was held in 2009, hosted by Guernsey and won by Bahrain. The 2011 and 2013 tournaments were both held in Botswana, and won by Kuwait and Nigeria, respectively. Because the WCL operates on a system of promotion and relegation, teams generally only participated in one or two Division Seven tournaments before being either promoted to Division Six or relegated, either to Division Eight or to regional competitions. Overall, 13 teams played in at least one Division Seven tournament, with Nigeria the only team to feature in all three tournaments.

Results

Performance by team
Legend
 – Champions
 – Runners-up
 – Third place
Q – Qualified
    — Hosts

Player statistics

References

Division 7